The Richmond Prison Detention and Workhouse, on the island of Saint Croix, U.S. Virgin Islands, was listed on the National Register of Historic Places in 1978.

It was designed largely by Johannes von Solligen Magens (1791–1837), with influence by Albert Lovmand, who was the builder of its enclosing walls in 1836.

It served as the Richmond Penitiary, as the state penal institution, until the 1960s.

References

Buildings and structures completed in 1833
Saint Croix, U.S. Virgin Islands
Buildings and structures completed in 1810
Buildings and structures on the National Register of Historic Places in the United States Virgin Islands
Government buildings in the United States Virgin Islands